Arpalıuşağı, historically Arapuşağı, is a village in the Hassa District, Hatay Province, Turkey. The village had a population of 634 in 2022.

In late 19th century, German orientalist Martin Hartmann listed the village as a settlement of 6 houses inhabited by Turks.

References

Villages in Hassa District